CLEI, the Centre for the Comparative Analysis of Law and Economics, Economics of Law, Economics of Institutions is a research center founded in 2004 by four renowned research universities, Cornell University Law School (School of Law, John M. Olin Program in Law and Economics), Ecole Polytechnique (Pole de Recherche en Economie et Gestion), University of Turin (Dipartimenti di Economia 'S.Cognetti de Martiis', Scienze Economiche e Finanziarie 'G.Prato', Scienze  Giuridiche) and the University of Ghent (Law School, Centre for Advanced Studies in Law and Economics).

Subsequently, the centre has been expanded to include the following partner universities.

 Marburg University
 University of Eastern Piedmont
 University of Economics, Prague
 Université Paul Cézanne Aix-Marseille III
 Panthéon-Assas University

Purpose

Though the law and economics movement has continental foundations as well as roots in American jurisprudence, over the past fifteen years the field has grown to be dominated by the Chicago law and economics school.  Despite the dominance of the Chicago approach, international scholars have made vast contributions to the field, and to the broader themes of legal theory surrounding law and economics.  The purpose of the CLEI Center and its IEL (Institutions, Economics, Law) Ph.D. program is to foster an alternative approach to the comparative analysis of law and economics.  To further this mission, the CLEI Centre and the Collegio Carlo Alberto attract highly qualified economists and legal theorists from around the world to introduce students to alternative traditions in the law and economics movement.

The CLEI Centre also sponsors scholarship focusing on empirical analysis of law.

CLEI/IEL Program

The centerpiece of CLEI is a three-year Ph.D. program.  The program is administered by the University of Turin, graduate division.  The CLEI Center also offers a one-year Master's program in Institutions, Economics and Law.  The coordinator of the program is Prof. Giovanni B. Ramello.

The Center sponsors conferences, visiting lecturers, and various other keynote addresses.

Speakers at CLEI have included Guido Calabresi, Duncan Kennedy and Ugo Mattei.

Location

The CLEI centre is located in the city of Moncalieri, (a suburb of the province of Torino) within the historic Collegio Carlo Alberto.

See also
University of Turin, Faculty of Law
Cornell Law School
Collegio Carlo Alberto
University of Turin

References

External links
 IEL Ph.D. Programme
 CLEI Homepage
 Collegio Carlo Alberto
 Partner Universities
 Outline of CLEI Research Unit

Law and economics
Legal research institutes
University of Turin
Education in Turin
Law schools in Italy
Universities in Piedmont